This is a list of weapons used by the Swedish Air Force.

Designating a weapon
Most weapons were designated by an m/xx number, the digits normally being the last two digits of the weapon's year of introduction to service. Missiles were designated with two digits after the "Rb" designation, which is short for "Robot", the Swedish word for missile.
With air-to-air missiles odd numbers indicated radar seekers like the Rb 71 or Sky Flash, even numbers indicate IR seekers like the Rb 98 or IRIS-T off-boresight air-to-air missile.

The abbreviations used for some weapons are derived from the type of weapon, arak being short for "attack rocket", and akan being short for "automatic cannon".

Air-to-air missiles
 Rb 321: Experimental active radar homing missile, meant to arm the J 35 Draken. It never entered production, as the SAF instead opted for Sidewinder and Falcon missiles.
 RB 24 Sidewinder: The air force's first operational air-to-air missile. Imported AIM-9B Sidewinder.
 Rb 72: Experimental short and medium range infrared-guided air-to-air missile for the fighter-interceptor JA 37 version of the Saab 37 Viggen ("Jaktviggen").
 RB 24J: Swedish designation of the AIM-9P3 Sidewinder. License-made with a Swedish-designed laser fuze.
 RB 74: Swedish designation of the imported AIM-9L Sidewinder, sometimes called the Rb 24L. Carried by the JA 37 Jaktviggen, the AJS 37 upgrade of the AJ 37 and the JAS 39 Gripen.
 RB 27: The Hughes Falcon GAR-3A missile in Swedish service equipped with new proximity fuze, and used on the J 35F/J Saab Draken.
 RB 28 Hughes Falcon GAR-4 IR seeker in a GAR-2 body.
 RB 71 The British Sky Flash semiactive air-to-air missile, carried by the JA 37 Jaktviggen.
 RB 98: Swedish designation of the IRIS-T air-to-air missile with IR seeking capabilities. Rb98 is also currently in use as a surface-to-air missile.
 RB 99: The US AIM-120 AMRAAM licensed and produced in Sweden for the Swedish Air Force under the name Rb99.
 RB 101: The MBDA Meteor in service with the Swedish Air Force since 11 July 2016.

Air-to-surface missiles
 RB 05 A joystick-controlled dual-mode missile developed by Bofors, primarily intended for the AJ 37 Viggen, but also fitted to the Sk 60B. The fuze could be set by the pilot to impact mode for ground targets, or proximity mode for attacking slow air targets such as bombers.
 RB 75, imported AGM-65A Maverick, a TV-guided, fire-and-forget air-to-surface missile. Used both in AGM and AShM roles. Carried by the AJ 37 Viggen and the later AJS 37 variants.
 RB 75T, variant of the RB 75 with heavier warhead, presumably with delayed fuze. Used in AShM role. The T denotes tung stridsdel, "heavy warhead". Carried by the AJ 37 Viggen and the later AJS 37 variants.

Anti-ship missiles
 Rb 302: experimental anti-ship missile tested 1947-1955.
 Rb 315: anti-ship missile.
 Rb 04: Swedish-built anti-ship missile in use since the early 1960s in C/D/E versions, carried by the A 32A Lansen and AJ 37, SH 37, and ASJH 37 variants of the Viggen.
 Rb 15F: Air-launched version of the Swedish RBS15 anti-ship missile. Carried on the AJS 37 Viggen and JAS 39 Gripen.

Surface-to-air missiles
 Rb 68 Bristol Bloodhound Mk. II high-altitude surface-to-air missile.
 Rb 67 Hawk surface-to-air missile.
 Rb 69 Redeye MANPAD.
 Rb 70 short-ranged surface-to-air missile developed by Bofors, laser beamrider.
 Rb 98 short-range infrared surface-to-air system based on the air-launched IRIS-T missile.

Guns
 20 mm akan m/45 - Bofors cannon used on the Saab 21 family of fighter and attacker planes.
 20 mm akan m/47B - Swedish designation for the Hispano Mk. V cannon, imported and carried on the J 28B, the Swedish-used variant of the de Havilland Vampire.
 20 mm akan m/47C - Swedish designation for the Hispano Mk. V cannon, but license-made by Bofors for the Saab 29 Tunnan series of jet fighters and attackers.
 20 mm akan m/49 - Bofors cannon used on the A 32A Lansen attacker jet. Based on the earlier akan m/45.
 30 mm akan m/55 - Swedish designation for the ADEN cannon. Used as primary armament on the J 32B Lansen, J 34 Hawker Hunter, and J 35 Draken. Also carried in wing-mounted gunpods under the designation 30 mm akankapsel, carried by the Sk 60B and AJ 37 Attackviggen, as these had no integral guns.
 30 mm akan m/75 - Swedish designation for the Oerlikon KCA. Mounted only on the JA 37 Jaktviggen fighter-interceptor, in an integral conformal pod, carrying 150 rounds of HEI and/or SAPHE ammunition. Inert training ammunition was available for target practice. The 30x173 mm round is among the most powerful ever used in a primary gun on a dedicated fighter plane.
 27 mm akan m/85 - Swedish designation for the Mauser BK-27 27mm autocannon mounted on the JAS 39 Gripen.

Rockets
 135 mm rocket pods made by Bofors
 70mm air-to-air rocket pods made by Bofors

Bombs
 120 kg m/71 high explosive bombs made by Bofors

See also
 Swedish Air Force

References

Sources
 "Bofors 350 år"
 "Viggen" - Sven Stridberg
 "Flygande Tunnan" - Lennart Berns
 "JAS 39 Gripen" -  Lindqvist Widfeldt
 "Svenskt Militärflyg" - Bo Vidfeldt / Åke Hall
 "Arboga Robot Museum"

Weapons
Lists of weapons